Steven MacLean, or a variation thereof, may refer to:

 Steve MacLean (astronaut) (born 1954), Canadian astronaut
 Steven MacLean (footballer) (born 1982), Scottish footballer (Sheffield Wednesday, Plymouth Argyle, St. Johnstone)
 Steve McLean (born 1961), Scottish-American soccer player
 Steven McLean (born 1981), Scottish football referee
 Stephen McLean, musician in Meat Whiplash
 Stephen McLean, see List of Global Television Network personalities
 Stephen MacLean (1950–2006), Australian screenwriter and director